Villa García–Manga Rural is a barrio (neighbourhood or district) of Montevideo, Uruguay.

Formerly there was an important agricultural school here, established by Juan D. Jackson. Nowadays it has been transformed in the Jacksonville development.

Places of worship
 Christ of Toledo Parish Church, Ruta 8 Nº 9303 (Roman Catholic)
 St. Joseph of Manga Chapel, in Jacksonville (Roman Catholic)
 Parish Church of St. Lawrence, Cno. Repetto 3937 (Roman Catholic, Salesian Sisters of Don Bosco)

See also 
Barrios of Montevideo

References

External links 

Official site of Villa García
Revista Raíces/ Historia del barrio Manga
Public school of Manga Rural on Camino Repetto 2952-3996
 

Barrios of Montevideo